Zhang Gan (17 September 1897 – 21 February 1959) was a Kuomintang general from Guangxi. Originally a major in the army of Lu Rongting's Old Guangxi clique, he went to over to Li Zongren's New Guangxi clique in 1926 and was subsequently promoted to Lieutenant Colonel and then Colonel. In 1938, he participated in the defense of Wuhan. In 1939, after his participation in defending the northern Hubei city of Zaoyang against the attacks of the Imperial Japanese Army commanded by Yasuji Okamura. On 30 November 1949, he was taken prisoner by the Chinese Communist Party's People's Liberation Army, 10 years later he died in prison (1959-02-21).

References

National Revolutionary Army generals from Guangxi
People from Guilin
1897 births
1959 deaths